Andrea Booher is a Colorado-based photographer, filmmaker, and photojournalist best known for her photographs of the World Trade Center site.

Education 
Booher has a liberal arts degree from Regis University. She studied International Relations and Spanish at the University of Colorado, and advanced Spanish at the University of Arizona's campus in Guadalajara, Mexico.

She won the Ernst Haas Photography Scholarship that she completed at the Anderson Ranch Art Center.

Career

Photography 
Booher has undertaken photography assignments from UNESCO, UNDP and UNIFEM.

Booher is a senior photographer for Federal Emergency Management Agency and has documented more than 190 US disasters for the agency.
Following the September 11 attack on the World Trade Center in Manhattan, New York, Booher, was given 24 hour access to the site. Booher was one of only two photographers who were granted access to the site. In the ten weeks she spent there following her arrival on September 12, she produced thousands of photographs documenting the role of the Federal Emergency Management Agency in the cleanup of ground zero. Some of her photos were used to present the case of the dangers facing those who worked on The Pile.

Booher photographed numerous disasters for FEMA in addition to the September 11 attacks, including floods in the Midwest, Hurricane Andrew, California earthquakes, the Cerro Grande fire in New Mexico, and others.

Exhibits and documentary 
Her work has been on display at the September 11 Museum since it opened in 2014. In 2011, Booher's documentary Portraits from Ground Zero aired on A&E in honor of the tenth anniversary of the attacks. Booher's work has been included in exhibitions at the International Center of Photography, the Museum of the City of New York, the New York Historical Society, the Smithsonian National Museum of American History among other venues.

Collections
Booher's work is included in the permanent collection of the Museum of Fine Arts Houston. The U.S. National Archives holds over 400 of her photographs.

Gallery

References

External links

Portraits from Ground Zero, Vimeo link

Living people
American photographers
American women photographers
American photojournalists
People from Colorado
Regis University alumni
University of Arizona alumni
University of Colorado Boulder alumni
American documentary film producers
Year of birth missing (living people)
Women photojournalists